{{DISPLAYTITLE:C15H11O7}}
The molecular formula C15H11O7 (molar mass: 303.24 g/mol, exact mass: 303.050477 u) may refer to:

 6-Hydroxycyanidin, an anthocyanidin 
 Delphinidin, an anthocyanidin

Molecular formulas